Avitta puncta is a moth of the family Noctuidae first described by Wileman in 1911. It is found in Japan and Taiwan.

The wingspan is 37–40 mm.

References

Moths described in 1913
Catocalinae
Moths of Japan
Moths of Taiwan